Introducing the Whitlams is the first studio album by Australian band The Whitlams, released by Phantom in 1993. The album features a mix of original and cover songs, including songs written by Whopping Big Naughty frontman Stanley Claret (born Justin Hayes, and credited as Justin Credible in the liner notes), brother of The Whitlams guitarist Stevie Plunder, and Everything but the Girl, among others.

Freedman has noted during a live performance of 'Gough' at The Basement in Sydney that he wrote the song while sharing a home in Newtown with Louis Burdett, and while practising the song, was told by Burdett that if he were going to "rip off Miles Davis, do it f***ing properly." Freedman then changed some notes in the song, making it what he called an "exact copy."

Track listing
"The Ballad of Lester Walker" (S. Plunder) – 3:25
"Where Is She?" (T. Freedman) – 4:16
"Happy Days" (S. Plunder) – 1:41
"Gough" (T. Freedman) – 3:16
"Mum's Going Out" (J. Credible, B. Rossen) – 0:26
"Pigeons in the Attic Room" (T. Thorn, B. Watt) – 1:55
"Woody" (T. Freedman) – 1:16
"Jumpin' Leprechauns" (J. Richman) – 2:15
"I'm Different" (R. Newman) – 2:04
"Winter Lovin'" (T. Freedman, A. Lewis, S. Plunder) – 3:18
 untitled hidden track from 3:48 to 6:50

Personnel
Tim Freedman - Piano, vocals
Andy Lewis - Double Bass, backing vocals
Stevie Plunder - Guitar, Vocals
Louis Burdett - drums on track 1, Brushes on track 2
Nick Cecire - cymbals on track 2, Drums on track 4
Rob Taylor - Producer, Engineer
Dave Henderson - Engineer
Guy Fleming - Photography

References

External links
Official site

1993 albums
The Whitlams albums